Jan Weyssenhoff could refer to:

Jan Weyssenhoff (general), Polish general
Jan Weyssenhoff (physicist), Polish physicist
Jan Weyssenhoff (writer), Polish writer